James Vasanthan is an Indian Television (Tamil) host, a film music composer, and a filmmaker and a motivational speaker. For more than two decades, he has worked as an anchor in popular Tamil satellite television channels like Sun TV and Vijay TV before debuting as a film music composer in the Tamil Film Industry in the year 2008, and a filmmaker in 2015.

Biography
James Vasanthan was born in Tiruchirapalli (Trichy), Tamil Nadu, India, to Brownie Sophia and George Theophilus, a police officer, who died in service, due to cancer. James was just 12 then. His mom used to tell him that her father Antony who was an engineer in the ropeway services in Anamalai Hills, Pollachi, erected and maintained by the Brits in the colonial times, was a meticulous person known for his discipline and strictness. James could see all of those traits in her. She was known to be a disciplinarian and perfectionist, excelling in every aspect of home-making. James owes every skill and craft that he possesses today, to her. Losing her when he was 21 was a turning point of his life.

He studied first at YWCA Primary School (Presently BHEL Matriculation Higher Secondary School) and later at Bishop Heber Higher Secondary School (Teppakulam) and then graduated in English literature from Bishop Heber College, Trichy, though his desire was to pursue a science degree. Being a single mother, she couldn't afford the high fee structure of a science course, which made him a literature student. Then he did his master's degree in English in Jamal Mohamed College. Later, he educated himself in Carnatic music from Madras University. It was his mentor Dr Uma Maheswari (former principal of Government College of Music, Thiruvaiyaru) who advised him to do this course and paid all his fees and provided every course material and resource, being a scholar in the subject. He looks up to her gratefully for all that she did to him. He also holds diplomas in Pianoforte, Guitar and Theory of Music in Western music from Trinity College, London.

After his studies he went to Kodaikanal and was working as the restaurant musician in Carlton Hotel, until he moved on to teach music in the residential school, St. Peter's School, Kodaikanal, formerly known as St. Peter's Public School. After a six-year stint as music teacher, he migrated to Madras to fulfill his long-term desire and dream of making as a film composer.

Though music was his "first love", he forayed into television as an anchor in SUN TV.

He has composed music for Christian audio albums numbering around 400. He still continues to arrange music for many gospel productions. In 2008, he eventually entered the Chennai film industry as a music director by composing the songs and score for the Tamil film Subramaniyapuram, directed by M. Sasikumar, who was a student at St. Peter's Public School in Kodaikanal, where James Vasanthan went to teach music after his post-graduation. This film 'Subramaniyapuram' which went on to become a blockbuster brought him into prominence with the film's songs and background score gaining fame and being praised. and the song "Kangal Irandal" topping the charts and being cited as the "anthem of the year among the youth".

Discography
As composer

As lyricist

As singer

References

Tamil film score composers
Living people
Musicians from Tiruchirappalli
Television personalities from Tamil Nadu
Year of birth missing (living people)